The Rani Chennamma Express is a train connecting the cities of Bengaluru and Miraj City,a medical hub in southern Maharashtra, India.

Rani Chennamma Express is a daily train maintained by South Western Railway, Bangalore division which  covers a distance of 
between SBC & MRJ.

Rani Chennamma Express previously ran as Kittur Express during meter gauge days.

The train is well known as the Queen of the South Western Railways .

Route
The Rani Chennamma Express travels overnight to Hubballi-Dharwad, Gokak, and Belagavi from KSR Bengaluru, the capital city of Karnataka. Rani Chennamma Express is the fastest overnight train between Bangalore & Hubballi-Dharwad. It leaves Bengaluru at 23:00 and reaches  Hubballi by 6:00 am and Miraj by 12:10 the following day. The train leaves Miraj at 15:35 pm, and reaches Bengaluru at 06:15 am the following day.

In addition to connecting the major cities of Maharashtra and Karnataka with Miraj, Hubballi, Dharwad, Belagavi, Ranebennur, Haveri, Davangere, Kadur, Tiptur, and Tumkuru with Bengaluru.

The train serves the smaller towns of Alnavar, Khanapur, Gokak, Ghatprabha, Chinchli, Kudchi, and Raybag to Medical City, Miraj Jn.

Rani Chennamma Express is South India's second-busiest train, after the Chennai Egmore–Mangalore Central Express.

Name and origin
The train is named after Rani (Queen) Chennamma  who ruled Northern Karnataka during the early 19th century and is known for her freedom struggle to free her province from British rule.

Rani Chennamma's capital was at Kittur in Belagavi district.

Rani Chennamma express Express origination from Miraj Junction traces Miraj's Historical as well as Medical significance since 1950 due to which people from major parts of Karnataka & Maharashtra visit Miraj.

References

External links 

 http://indiarailinfo.com/train/rani-chennamma-express-16589-sbc-to-kop/1373/136/77
 http://gudtimes.in/rani-chennamma-express-train-not-just-connects-places-but-also-people-and-their-heart/

Express trains in India
Named passenger trains of India
Transport in Bangalore
Rail transport in Dharwad
Transport in Kolhapur
Rail transport in Karnataka
Rail transport in Maharashtra
Railway services introduced in 1995